Brazil is the debut studio album recorded by American female vocal trio The Ritchie Family, released in 1975 on the 20th Century label.

History
The album features the title track, which peaked at No. 1 on the Hot Dance/Disco chart, No. 11 on the Billboard Hot 100, and No. 13 on the Hot Soul Singles chart. Another single, "Dance with Me", had moderate success on the charts.

Track listing

Production
Jacques Morali – producer
Henri Belolo – general supervision
Joe Tarsia, Jay Mark – engineers
Michael Hutchinson, Dirk Devlin, J.D. Stewart – assistant engineers
Grand Illusion – album cover design
Richie Rome – arranger, assistant producer

Charts

Singles

References

External links
 

1975 debut albums
The Ritchie Family albums
Albums produced by Jacques Morali
Albums recorded at Sigma Sound Studios
20th Century Fox Records albums